Naib Subedar Chuni Lal AC, VrC, SM was an Indian Army soldier of 8th battalion. The Jammu and Kashmir Light Infantry (8 JAK LI). He was born in Bhaderwah, and basically from Gandhari Paddar and lived in Bhara village with parents Shanker Dass and Shakuntala Devi in Doda district of Jammu. 
Decorated with Vir Chakra and Sena Medal (Gallantry), JC-593527, Lal was killed in action on 24 June 2007 in a militant flush-out operation in Kashmir's Kupwara sector. These militants, all of whom were also shot dead, were trying to cross the Line of Control (LoC) and enter Indian territory. The success of this militant flush-out operation, which claimed his life, earned him the highest peacetime military decoration awarded for valor, courageous action or self-sacrifice away from the battlefield, the Ashok Chakra. He is the highest decorated soldier of Indian Army of all time, honored with Sena Medal, Vir Chakra and Ashok Chakra.

Career
In 1984, Lal joined the 8th Battalion, The Jammu and Kashmir Light Infantry Regiment. In 1987, he volunteered and participated in an operation to capture the quaid post which was later called the Bana Top, located at 21,153 feet in the Siachen Glacier, for which he was awarded the Sena Medal (Gallantry). During June 1987, the 8th JAK LI, was deployed in the Siachen area. It was then found that a large number of Pakistani infiltrators had intruded over the Siachen Glacier. The ejection of these infiltrators was difficult but necessary and a special task force was constituted for this purpose. Chuni Lal and other soldiers of the unit such as Naib Subedar (later Sub Maj and Hony Capt) Bana Singh volunteered to join this force. The Pakistani intrusion had taken place at a height of 6500 metres at the highest peak in the Siachen Glacier area. From this feature the Pakistanis could snipe at Indian army positions since the height gave them a clear view of the entire Saltoro range and Siachen glacier. The Pakistanis called this post 'Quaid post' after their founder Quaid-e-azam Mohammad Ali Jinnah. The enemy post was a glacier fortress with ice walls, 457 metres high, on either side. On 26 June 1987, Naib Subedar Bana Singh led Chuni Lal and other men through an extremely difficult and hazardous route. These men crawled and closed in on the adversary and cleared the post of all intruders. This operation was named as Operation Rajiv and Nb Sub Bana Singh was awarded Param Vir Chakra for courage and bravery.

In 1999, in the Poonch sector of Jammu and Kashmir during Operation Rakshak, he fought an attempted intrusion by the Pakistan Army and was instrumental in killing 12 intruders and saved the post from enemy capture. He was awarded the Vir Chakra, for gallantry.

He also did two tenures with the United Nations Peace Keeping Force in Somalia and Sudan. Display of exemplary courage by his team in Sudan won his unit a UN citation for valour.

On 21 June 2007, Lal was promoted naib subedar (seniority from 1 June). Only three days later, on 24 June 2007, Lal was in charge of a post in Kupwara, Jammu and Kashmir. The post was at height of 14,000 feet where visibility on that cloudy night was just 5 metres and temperature was minus 5 degrees. Around 3:30am, he detected some movement across the fence on the Line of Control and decided to check it. He deployed his soldiers at the LoC. An exchange of fire followed, which continued for almost an hour. Nb Sub Chuni Lal and his soldiers surrounded the whole area and searched for their assailants till dawn. Finally as Nb Sub Chunni Lal and his team were approaching to search a sketchy bushy patch, they were suddenly fired upon. The men continued to close on to the area where their attackers were hiding and killed two of them on the spot. In the gunfire, two army soldiers were seriously wounded and lay close to where their attackers hid. With disregard to his personal safety, Chuni Lal crawled towards the wounded men and pulled them to safety thus saving their lives. Anticipating more hidden attackers, he continued to search the area. His anticipation proved right and he saw a third attacker trying to escape. Nb Sub Chuni Lal charged at him with his weapon and killed him. Unfortunately, an exchange fire from the attacker split opened Nb Sub Chunni Lal's abdomen and he began to lose lot of blood. He took cover behind a rock, continued to fire and did not allow the other attackers to break the cordon. Under his leadership the two remaining attackers were also killed.

Chuni Lal had lost a large volume of blood and died by the time a helicopter could airlift him to nearest Army Hospital. For his actions in battle, Nb Sub Chuni Lal was posthumously awarded the Ashok Chakra on 15 August 2007 for saving the lives of his fellow men, displaying most conspicuous bravery, demonstrating battle field leadership and laying down his life to protect the country.

Nb Sub Chuni Lal is survived by his wife Chinta Devi, and three children - son and two daughters. His wifeChinta Devi received his Ashok Chakra medal from the President of India at the Republic Day Parade of 26 January 2008.

Gallantry Awards

Ashoka Chakra Award Details 
The published details of the Ashoka Chakra Award:

Vir Chakra Award Citation 
The citation for  the Vir Chakra reads as follows:

References

Indian Army officers
People from Jammu and Kashmir
Recipients of the Ashoka Chakra (military decoration)
Recipients of the Vir Chakra
1968 births
2007 deaths
People from Doda district
Ashoka Chakra